The 2008–09 Primeira Liga was the 75th season of the Primeira Liga, the top professional league for Portuguese association football clubs. It began on 22 August 2008 and ended on 24 May 2009. Porto was the three-time defending champions and secured a fourth consecutive title for the second time in its history.

Promotion and relegation

Teams relegated to Liga de Honra
Boavista
União de Leiria

União de Leiria have been relegated to the Liga de Honra after finishing in last place in 2007–08 Primeira Liga.

Boavista were also relegated as a punishment for their participation in a match fixing scandal in 2003–04 season. Accordingly, Paços de Ferreira, which was originally scheduled to be relegated, was saved from demotion.

Teams promoted from Liga de Honra
Trofense
Rio Ave

Leiria and Boavista were replaced by two promoted teams from Liga de Honra. The first was Trofense, which clinched the second level title. This was its first appearance in Primeira Liga.

Trofense was accompanied by Rio Ave, which returned to the Primeira Liga after two seasons in the Liga de Honra.

Club information

League table

Results

Top scorers

Awards

SJPF Player of the Month

SJPF Young Player of the Month

Awards
 Primeira Liga  Champions – Porto
 Primeira Liga  Top Scorer – Nenê (20 goals)
 Primeira Liga  Player of the Year – Bruno Alves
 Primeira Liga  Goalkeeper of the Year – Beto
 Primeira Liga  Referee of the Year – Olegário Benquerença

References

External links
 Calendar of the Portuguese League 

Primeira Liga seasons
Port
1